Jambe may refer to:

Jambe, Indonesia
Jambe, Kenya